Hover Ace is a 2001 video game developed by GSC Game World and published by Russobit-M.

Development 
According to Oleg Yavorsky, PR-manager of Hover Ace, "The biggest challenge was to create and balance the physical model of vehicles and game environment. It also took quite some time to optimize the engine for working with open areas."

Critical reception 
PC World Poland gave the game a rating of 4/5 stars.  Igray.ru wrote the game was "well balanced and smoothly made". Gamezone concluded it was a " slightly above average title". 7Wolf negatively compared it to the "purely military games" of GSC Game World. Absolute Games felt the title was  imbued with the spirit" of games such as Rollcage and Star Wars Episode I: Racer.

References

External links 

 Main page

2001 video games
Science fiction racing games
Vehicular combat games
Video games developed in Ukraine
Windows games
Windows-only games
Russobit-M games
GSC Game World games